"The Wind Changes" is a song written and originally recorded by Johnny Cash.

Released in September 1967 as a single (Columbia 4-44288, with "Red Velvet" on the opposite side), it debuted on the U.S. Billboard country chart on the week of October 28, eventually reaching number 60.

Later the song was included on Johnny Cash's album Old Golden Throat (1968).

Track listing

Charts

References

External links 
 "The Wind Changes" on the Johnny Cash official website

Johnny Cash songs
1967 songs
1967 singles
Columbia Records singles
Songs written by Johnny Cash
Song recordings produced by Don Law